Emmanuel Essuman Mensah (born September 29, 1989), known as Kingzkid, is a Ghanaian Christian hip pop recording artist and songwriter. He is the first African Gospel Musician to win the Gospel Academy Awards Best International Act 2019 award.

Music career 
Kingzkid released his first album "Vindicated" in 2011 and "Metamorphosis" in 2014. He is the President of Gifted Music Records and Founder of "Amplified" a youth movement which also hosts an annual concert dubbed Amplified Concert which aims at winning souls for Christ.

He has collaborated and performed with numerous gospel musicians, including Mali Music, Tim Godfrey, Ohemaa Mercy Joe Mettle, MOG Music, Micah Stampley, Sinach, Denzel Prempeh, Nii Okai.

Discography

Albums 
 Vindicated (2011)
 Metamorphosis (2014)

Selected Singles
 I got my Jesus on
 He go do for you
 Thy kingdom come

Awards and nomination

References 

Ghanaian Christians
Ghanaian musicians
Living people
1989 births